Cipher Bureau is a 1938 American film directed by Charles Lamont. The film was successful enough to elicit a sequel, Panama Patrol.

Plot
Philip Waring, the head of a listening agency in Washington D.C., is dedicated to breaking up a foreign radio-spy ring.  He enlists his naval-officer brother and tangles with beautiful spies.

Cast 
 Leon Ames as Philip Waring 
 Charlotte Wynters as Helen Lane 
 Joan Woodbury as Therese Brahm 
 Don Dillaway as Paul Waring 
 Gustav von Seyffertitz as Albert Grood 
 Tenen Holtz as Simon Herrick 
 Walter Bonn as Anton Decker 
 Si Wills as Lt. Clarke 
 George Lynn as Lt. Tydall  
 Jason Robards as Ellsworth 
 Sidney Miller as Jimmy 
 Hooper Atchley as Commander Nash 
 Robert Frazer as Paul's counsel

External links 
 
 Turner Classic Movies page

1938 films
American black-and-white films
Films directed by Charles Lamont
Grand National Films films
1938 drama films
American drama films
Cryptography in fiction
1930s English-language films
1930s American films